James Dunwoody Bulloch (June 25, 1823 – January 7, 1901) was the Confederacy's chief foreign agent in Great Britain during the American Civil War. Based in Liverpool, he operated blockade runners and commerce raiders that provided the Confederacy with its only source of hard currency. Bulloch arranged for the purchase by British merchants of Confederate cotton, as well as the dispatch of armaments and other war supplies to the South. He also oversaw the construction and purchase of several ships designed at ruining Northern shipping during the Civil War, including CSS Florida, CSS Alabama, CSS Stonewall, and CSS Shenandoah. Due to him being a Confederate secret agent, Bulloch was not included in the general amnesty that came after the Civil War and therefore decided to stay in Liverpool, becoming the director of the Liverpool Nautical College and the Orphan Boys Asylum.

Bulloch's half-brother Irvine Bulloch was a Confederate naval officer and his half-sister Martha Roosevelt was the mother of U.S. President Theodore Roosevelt and paternal grandmother of First Lady Eleanor Roosevelt.

Birth and early years 

James D. Bulloch was born in 1823 on his family's plantation near Savannah, Georgia, to Major James Stephens Bulloch (son of Captain James Bulloch and Ann Irvine) and Hester Amarintha Elliott (daughter of Senator John Elliott and Esther Dunwoody). After Hester died, Major Bulloch enrolled his son in a private school in Hartford, Connecticut.

The elder Bulloch married again, to the widow Martha Stewart, in May 1832. She had been the second wife and widow of Senator John Elliott. James S. and Martha Bulloch had four children: Anna; Martha; Charles Irvine (who died young); and Irvine Stephens Bulloch.

In 1838, Major Bulloch moved his family from the Low Country to Cobb County, in the Piedmont. There he became a partner with Roswell King in a new cotton mill. In what would become Roswell, Georgia, he had a grand home built, made by the labor of free craftsmen and enslaved artisans. When it was completed in 1839, the family moved into Bulloch Hall. However, Bulloch never lived there as he was in the navy when it finished construction.

James S. Bulloch kept a large amount of land in cotton cultivation. He died in 1849; Mrs. Bulloch still held 31 enslaved African-Americans in 1850, according to the census slave schedules.

Marriage and family
James Dunwoody Bulloch married Elizabeth Caskie in 1851. After her early death, he married Mrs. Hariott Cross Foster, a widow, of Baton Rouge, Louisiana, in 1857. They had five children together.

Naval service and European agent of Confederacy 

Bulloch served in the United States Navy for about 15 years before resigning his commission in 1854 to join a private shipping company. When the Southern states seceded from the Union and the Civil War began in 1861, one of the Union's first acts was to create a naval blockade of Confederate ports to cut off commerce in the South.

In April 1861, while his ship was in New Orleans, Bulloch offered to assist the Confederate States of America. When he returned to New York, he found a letter from C.S.A. Attorney General Judah P. Benjamin accepting his offer and ordering him to Montgomery, Alabama, for his assignment. James D. Bulloch soon became a Confederate secret agent and their "most dangerous man" in Europe, according to Union State Department officials.

Less than two months after the attack on Fort Sumter, Bulloch arrived at Liverpool, England, and established a base of operations there. Britain was officially neutral in the conflict between North and South, but private and public sentiment was divided between the two belligerents. British merchants were also willing to buy all the cotton that could be smuggled past the Union blockade, which provided the South with its only real source of revenue. Bulloch established a relationship with the shipping firm of Fraser, Trenholm, & Company to buy and sell Confederate cotton; the company became, in effect, the Confederacy's international bankers. George Trenholm served as Treasurer of the Confederacy in the last year of the war.

Bulloch worked closely with Charles K. Prioleau who handled Confederacy funding in England and arranged for the construction and secret purchase of the commerce raider CSS Alabama. He arranged for cotton to be converted to hard currency, which he in turn used to purchase badly needed war materiel, including arms and ammunition, uniforms, and naval supplies. He also arranged for the construction of the CSS Florida; along with the Alabama, the ship preyed upon the Union's merchant fleet. James' younger half-brother, Irvine S. Bulloch, served in the Confederate States Navy on the Alabama.

Realizing that he needed a steady flow of funds to support the purchasing program as well as a way to ship materiel from England, Bulloch decided to buy a steamship, the SS Fingal, which was renamed the CSS Atlanta. He filled it with ordnance which he and an agent of the Southern War Department had accumulated and then sailed to America.

Bulloch later returned to Liverpool and continued his business relationship with Fraser, Trenholm & Co. He was involved in constructing and acquiring a number of other warships and blockade runners for the Confederacy, including the purchase of the Sea King, which was renamed the CSS Shenandoah. Bulloch instructed Confederate Navy Captain James Iredell Waddell to sail "into the seas and among the islands frequented by the great American whaling fleet, a source of abundant wealth to our enemies and a nursery for their seamen. It is hoped that you may be able to greatly damage and disperse that fleet." The CSS Shenandoah fired the last shots of the war on June 28, 1865, during a raid on American whalers in the Bering Sea.

Possible connection to Lincoln assassination plot 
From his base in Great Britain, Bulloch was the financier of many covert Confederate naval operations within the British Empire. This aspect of his intelligence operations has eluded the many analysts and historians who have studied the Canadian elements of the conspiracy to assassinate President Abraham Lincoln.

In late 1864, the Confederate States Secretary of the Navy, Stephen Mallory, ordered Bulloch to write a check drawn on "secret funds" to Patrick Martin, a Confederate blockade runner operating from Canada. These funds were intended to support the plot to kidnap Abraham Lincoln. Martin's project later evolved into a successful assassination plot. Captain Martin and his ship were lost in a storm in December 1864, as he was en route to Maryland with supplies for John Wilkes Booth.

When John Surratt, the last surviving member of the Lincoln assassination conspiracy, arrived in Liverpool in 1865, there is no evidence he contacted Bulloch, who kept a very low profile.

After the war
As Confederate secret agents, James and Irvine Bulloch were not included in the general amnesty that the federal government approved after the Civil War. They decided to stay in Liverpool, where they became quite successful as cotton importers and brokers.

During the 1880s, a young Theodore Roosevelt, known as T.R., persuaded his "Uncle Jimmie" Bulloch to write and publish an account of his activities during the Civil War. The Secret Service of the Confederate States in Europe was published in two volumes in 1883. T.R. wrote to his mother telling of his success with the project saying, "I have persuaded him [James Bulloch] to publish a work which only he possesses the materials to write." In return, Uncle Jimmie spent considerable time schooling his energetic nephew on the operations of wind-powered ships in the Age of Sail and explained much about ship-to-ship fighting tactics, as Theodore had no personal experience or training in early 19th-century naval warfare. Roosevelt drew from this tutoring, and his long hours spent in libraries researching the official records of the U.S. Navy, for his book The Naval War of 1812.

Theodore Roosevelt on the Bullochs
In 1905, the height of reconciliation between the North and the South, incumbent President Theodore Roosevelt toured the South. After spending October 19 in North Carolina and skipping South Carolina, Roosevelt visited Roswell, Georgia the next day. He spoke to the citizens as his "neighbors and friends" and concluded his remarks as follows:

In Roosevelt's autobiography, he mentions the Bullochs as follows:

Later years 
James died in Liverpool at the home of his daughter and son-in-law at 76 Canning Street, Canning, Liverpool, England, in 1901, at the age of 77. His headstone in Liverpool's Toxteth Park Cemetery bears the inscription: "An American by birth, an Englishman by choice".

See also 
 Bulloch Hall, antebellum home of the Bulloch family in Roswell, Georgia

References 
 Bulloch, James D. The Secret Service of the Confederate States in Europe; or, How the Confederate Cruisers Were Equipped. (London, 1883; New York, 1884)
 Wilson, Walter E. and Gary L. Mckay. James D. Bulloch; Secret Agent and Mastermind of the Confederate Navy. (Jefferson, NC: McFarland & Co., 2012) .

There are biographical sketches in The American National Biography (supplementary volume) and The Oxford Dictionary of National Biography.

Further reading

External links 

Bulloch Hall - Historic Roswell, Georgia at www.bullochhall.org (official website)
Port Cities: - James Dunwoody Bulloch at www.mersey-gateway.org
New Georgia Encyclopedia: James D. Bulloch (1823-1901) at georgiaencyclopedia.org 

1823 births
1901 deaths
Bulloch family
Confederate States Navy
CSS Alabama
People from Roswell, Georgia
Military personnel from Savannah, Georgia
People of Georgia (U.S. state) in the American Civil War